The following is a list of notable events and releases that occurred in 2010 Canadian music.

Events

January
 1 January – Folk singer Lhasa de Sela dies in Montreal of breast cancer.
 19 January – Folk singer Kate McGarrigle dies in Montreal.

April
 18 April 
Devon Clifford, drummer for the indie rock band You Say Party! We Say Die! dies of complications from a brain hemorrhage he suffered two nights previous while performing onstage in Vancouver.
The 2010 Juno Awards

June
 17 June
The 2010 Polaris Music Prize 40-album longlist is announced.
The Broken Social Scene concert film This Movie Is Broken, directed by Bruce McDonald, premieres as part of Toronto's NXNE festival.
 29 June – Rapper/singer Drake is sued by Playboy Enterprises over the use of the 1974 song "Fallin' In Love" by Hamilton, Joe Frank & Reynolds in Drake's 2009 hit "Best I Ever Had." Playboy, which owns the rights to "Fallin' In Love," claims Drake used the song's sample without permission and is seeking to claim any profits made from the Drake single.

July
 6 July – The Polaris Music Prize 10-album shortlist is announced.

September
 20 September – Karkwa's album Les Chemins de verre wins the 2010 Polaris Music Prize.

Albums released

A
The Acorn, No Ghost
aKido, Gamechanger
Annihilator, Annihilator
Apollo Ghosts, Mount Benson
Arcade Fire, The Suburbs

B
Baby Eagle, Dog Weather
Matthew Barber, True Believer
Barenaked Ladies, All in Good Time
The Beauties, The Beauties
Bedouin Soundclash, Light the Horizon
Ridley Bent, Rabbit on My Wheel
The Besnard Lakes, The Besnard Lakes Are the Roaring Night
Justin Bieber, My World 2.0
The Birthday Massacre, Pins and Needles
Black Mountain, Wilderness Heart
Born Ruffians, Say It
Bran Van 3000, The Garden
Brasstronaut, Mt. Chimaera
Broken Social Scene, Forgiveness Rock Record
Jim Bryson and The Weakerthans, The Falcon Lake Incident
Buck 65, 20 Odd Years
Basia Bulat, Heart of My Own
Matthew Byrne, Ballads

C
Kathryn Calder, Are You My Mother?
 Paul Cargnello, La Course des loups
Caribou, Swim
 Chic Gamine, City City
Chromeo, Business Casual
Jason Collett, Rat a Tat Tat
Ève Cournoyer, Tempête
Crash Karma, Crash Karma
Crystal Castles, Crystal Castles

D
Tanya Davis, Clocks and Hearts Keep Going
Delerium, Remixed: The Definitive Collection
Shawn Desman, Fresh
Diamond Rings, Special Affections
Dirty Circus, Alive and Well
Fefe Dobson, Joy
Luke Doucet, Steel City Trawler
Gordon Downie, The Grand Bounce
Drake, Thank Me Later
D-Sisive, Vaudeville

E
Fred Eaglesmith, Cha Cha Cha
Elephant Stone, The Glass Box
Elise Estrada, Here Kitty Kittee

F
Frazey Ford, Obadiah
Forest City Lovers, Carriage
Frog Eyes, Paul's Tomb: A Triumph

G
Hannah Georgas, This Is Good
Ghostkeeper, Ghostkeeper
Gigi, Maintenant
The Golden Dogs, Coat of Arms
Gonzales, Ivory Tower
Jenn Grant, Songs for Siigoun
Grey Kingdom, The Grey Kingdom
Emm Gryner, Gem and I
Jim Guthrie, Now, More Than Ever (Extended Edition)

H
Sarah Harmer, Oh Little Fire
Holy Fuck, Latin
Hot Hot Heat, Future Breeds
Hot Panda, How Come I'm Dead?
Huron, Huron

I
Chin Injeti, D'tach

J
Japandroids, No Singles
Lyndon John X, Brighter Days

K
Kalle Mattson, Anchors
Karkwa, Les Chemins de verre
Kyrie Kristmanson, Origin of Stars

L
Land of Talk, Cloak and Cipher
Richard Laviolette and the Oil Spills, All of Your Raw Materials
Library Voices, Denim on Denim

M
Ryan MacGrath, Cooper Hatch Paris
Emma McKenna, Run With It
Sarah McLachlan, Laws of Illusion
Greg MacPherson, Mr. Invitation
Kate Maki, Two Song Wedding
Martha and the Muffins, Delicate
Michou, Cardona
Millimetrik, Mystique Drums (LP), Afterglow (EP)
Ruth Minnikin, Depend on This
Ariane Moffatt, Trauma: Chansons de la série télé
The Mohawk Lodge, Crimes
Ruth Moody, The Garden
The Most Serene Republic, Fantasick Impossibliss
The Mountains and the Trees, I Made This for You

N
The New Pornographers, Together
No Kids, Judy at the Grove

O
Old Man Luedecke, My Hands Are on Fire and Other Love Songs
Olenka and the Autumn Lovers, And Now We Sing
Jenny Omnichord, All Our Little Bones

P
The Pack A.D., We Kill Computers
Steven Page, Page One
Owen Pallett, Heartland
Philémon Cimon, Les Sessions cubaines
Pigeon Hole, Age Like Astronauts
Dany Placard, Placard 
Plants and Animals, La La Land
Po' Girl, Follow Your Bliss
Postdata, Postdata
Ghislain Poirier, Running High
 The Provincial Archive, Maybe We Could Be Holy

R
Radio Radio, Belmundo Regal
Rah Rah, Breaking Hearts
Raised by Swans, No Ghostless Place
Johnny Reid, A Place Called Love
Rise Ashen and Ammoye, Haffi Win
Daniel Romano, Workin' for the Music Man
The Russian Futurists, The Weight's on the Wheels
Justin Rutledge, The Early Widows

S
The Sadies, Darker Circles
The Salteens, Grey Eyes
Samian, Face à la musique
John K. Samson, Provincial Road 222
Ivana Santilli, Santilli
Secret and Whisper, Teenage Fantasy
Shad, TSOL
Shapes and Sizes, Candle to Your Eyes
The Sheepdogs, Learn & Burn
Siskiyou, Siskiyou
Small Sins, Pot Calls Kettle Black
Snailhouse, Monumental Moments
Jay Sparrow, In Our Time
Rae Spoon, Love Is a Hunter
Frederick Squire, March 12 – 2 November
Kinnie Starr, A Different Day
Stars, The Five Ghosts
Sum 41, Screamer
Suuns, Zeroes QC
Swollen Members, Greatest Hits: Ten Years of Turmoil

T
Maylee Todd, Choose Your Own Adventure
Tokyo Police Club, Champ
Trillionaire$, By Hook or by Crook

V
Diyet van Lieshout, The Breaking Point
Leif Vollebekk, Inland

W
Rufus Wainwright, All Days Are Nights: Songs for Lulu
The Weakerthans, Live at the Burton Cummings Theatre
The Wheat Pool, Behind the Stars
Winter Gloves, All Red
Wintersleep, New Inheritors
Wolf Parade, Expo 86
Women, Public Strain
Royal Wood, The Waiting
Woodhands, Remorsecapade
Woodpigeon, Die Stadt Muzikanten
Woodpigeon, Balladeer: To All the Guys I've Loved Before
Donovan Woods, The Widowmaker
Wool on Wolves, Grey Matter
Hawksley Workman, Meat
Hawksley Workman, Milk

Y
Nikki Yanofsky, Nikki
You Say Party, REMIXXXX
Neil Young, Le Noise
Yukon Blonde, Yukon Blonde

Z
Zeus, Say Us

Top hits on record

Top 10 albums
These albums consist of Canadian sales only.

Top 10 American albums
These albums are Canadian sales only.

Top British albums

Top International albums

Top 10 Singles

Canadian Hot 100 Year-End List

Deaths
1 January – Lhasa de Sela, folk singer-songwriter
18 January – Kate McGarrigle, folk singer-songwriter
21 January – Paul Quarrington, novelist (Whale Music) and musician
9 February – Jacques Hétu, composer
15 March – Dan Achen, former guitarist for Junkhouse
18 April – Devon Clifford, drummer for You Say Party! We Say Die!
22 April – Gene Lees, music critic and songwriter
16 June – Maureen Forrester, opera singer
27 July – Edward Gamblin, country rock singer-songwriter

See also 
 2010s in music
 2010 in Canadian television

References